Fernando Albermager (born 19 January 1979 in Uruguay) is a Uruguayan retired footballer.

References

Uruguayan footballers
Living people
1979 births
Association football defenders
Sud América players